M166 may refer to:

M-166 (Michigan highway), a state highway in Michigan
Mercedes-Benz M166 engine, an automobile engine
PNS Munsif (M166), a Pakistan Navy Munsif-class minehunter